"The Deadly Attachment" is the first episode of the sixth series of the British television sitcom Dad's Army. It was originally transmitted on Wednesday 31 October 1973. It has become one of the best known episodes of the series due to the rare encounter between the platoon and the Germans. A scene in which a German officer demands to know Private Pike's name, and Captain Mainwaring says "Don't tell him, Pike!", has been judged as one of the top three greatest comedy moments of British television.

Plot
Captain Mainwaring is giving the platoon a lecture on parachutists and the need to determine the respective identities of British and German parachutists. This eventually ends up becoming a discussion on the possibility of refugee nuns parachuting into Britain. Mainwaring's lecture is interrupted by a telephone call from GHQ; the survivors of a sunken German U-Boat have been picked up by a fishing boat and taken to Walmington-on-Sea. The Home Guard unit is to be responsible for providing security until the proper military escort can arrive. Mainwaring, excited at finally getting to grips with the enemy, sets off with most of the platoon to collect the prisoners, but not before ordering Sergeant Wilson and Private Pike to prime the platoon's allocation of hand grenades.

Pike is naturally excited at throwing around a lot of (unprimed) hand grenades and pretending to be a gangster; Wilson is a lot more cautious, and on discovering a collection of dummy detonators along with the real charges, opts to prime the grenades with dummies, reasoning that in the event of an invasion a switch could be made quickly, as allowing certain members of the platoon to be in charge of live grenades is very dangerous.

The prisoners, including their smug and surly captain, are held in the church hall until the escort arrives. However, Mainwaring receives another phone call from GHQ, saying the escort has been delayed and won't arrive until tomorrow — meaning the Home Guard will be responsible for the prisoners overnight, including the feeding of them. Corporal Jones's suggestion of cutting the prisoners' trouser buttons off is dismissed by the U-Boat captain as being a violation of the Geneva Convention, thus earning Mainwaring's ire. Mainwaring refers to Adolf Hitler as a tinpot dictator resembling Charlie Chaplin, annoying the captain, who starts to make a list of names of who he will seek out for retribution once the war ends. Pike sings a song in which Hitler is called a "twerp"; the captain says that his name will also go on the list, and asks what it is. Mainwaring says "Don't tell him, Pike!", thus inadvertently revealing Pike's name.

After the prisoners receive a fish and chip supper ordered by Private Walker (including soggy chips, despite the U-Boat captain's demands), the platoon settle down to guard the prisoners overnight. The Verger and Warden Hodges enter the hall after a night out drinking to find the prisoners there waiting for them. Taking advantage of the distraction, the U-boat captain feigns illness and manages to steal Mainwaring's revolver, seizing Hodges as a hostage.

A tense stand-off between the Germans (housed in the Vicar's office with their hostage) and the British (in the main hall with superior firepower) sees the platoon try to recapture the situation. During a conversation about different films, Mainwaring gets an idea; he agrees to release the prisoners, confident that someone in the town will see them escaping. However, the captain has anticipated this – the platoon will be forced to escort the prisoners through town and back to the harbour so as to offset suspicion, and will then accompany them back to France to ensure that the Royal Navy do not intervene. Once they are across the channel, his list will be closely examined. Cooperation will be further enforced by a grenade attached to a line of string in Jones' waistband, which the captain will activate at any hint of trouble.

Fortunately, the U-boat captain's plan is inadvertently thwarted by Mainwaring's senior officer, Colonel Pritchard, who chances upon the marching platoon en route to the harbour and, seeing the string in Jones' waistband, immediately pulls it. In the resulting chaos, Wilson calmly asks the Colonel for his gun, and uses it to recapture the Germans, forcing them up against the wall. Upon being told by Wilson that the grenades had been primed with false detonators, Mainwaring angrily asks why Wilson can never follow his orders, before realising that in doing so Wilson saved Jones's life. Jones then requests if someone could ask Private Frazer to remove his hand from his trousers.

Cast

Arthur Lowe as Captain Mainwaring
John Le Mesurier as Sergeant Wilson
Clive Dunn as Lance-Corporal Jones
John Laurie as Private Frazer
James Beck as Private Walker
Arnold Ridley as Private Godfrey
Ian Lavender as Private Pike
Philip Madoc as U-boat Captain
Bill Pertwee as ARP Warden Hodges
Edward Sinclair as The Verger
Robert Raglan as The Colonel
Colin Bean as Private Sponge

Notes

Despite playing a one-off guest character, actor Philip Madoc's portrayal of the scheming U-boat captain is regularly recalled in the series. When Madoc died in 2012, BBC News broadcast a clip from this episode as part of their obituary.
Half of the length of string used during filming was in the collection of Jimmy Perry, while the other half is in the Blitz and Pieces museum near Great Yarmouth, having been donated by David Croft.
A song played in this episode was "All over the Place" by Jay Wilbur and his band and the Greene Sisters. The same song was previously used several times in Sons of the Sea.
This series marks the last 6 episode appearances of James Beck as Private Joe Walker, prior to his death that year.
The grenade was scripted to be inserted into Mainwaring's trousers, but Arthur Lowe refused and so Jones was chosen instead.

Adaptations
The episode was adapted for radio and a recreation of this episode formed the fourth instalment of the 2007 Dad's Army Stage Show. In 1976, the episode script was selected as the basis of an unsuccessful pilot episode for an American Broadcasting Company adaptation called The Rear Guard. The script also forms part of the combination of four shortened episodes published for amateur production.

The episode has been adapted on a number of occasions. Some changes were made when this episode was adapted for radio. In particular, it was The Vicar, not Hodges, who became the hostage.

References

Dad's Army (series 6) episodes
1973 British television episodes
American television series based on British television series
Military humor in film